The 'Men's Double Advanced Metric Round Paraplegic was an archery competition in the 1984 Summer Paralympics.

As the only competitors in this event, the French team won the gold medal unopposed.

Results

References

1984 Summer Paralympics events